Collinsia grandiflora is a species of flowering plant in the plantain family known by the common names giant blue eyed Mary and large-flowered collinsia. This wildflower is native to western North America from British Columbia to northern California where it grows in coniferous understory and woodland.

Description
This is an erect annual herb reaching about 35 centimeters in maximum height. It produces a thin stem and narrow leaves and looks grasslike before flowering. It produces a showy inflorescence which is separated into interrupted levels, with each level producing a row of one to several flowers. Each pea-like flower is just over a centimeter wide and bright purple with white upper lips. The fruit is a capsule containing four seeds. The plant is relatively small, but its features are larger than most other Collinsia, hence its common names.

External links
Jepson Manual Treatment OF Collinsia grandiflora
USDA Plants Profile FOR Collinsia grandiflora
Collinsia grandiflora — U.C. Photo gallery

grandiflora
Flora of British Columbia
Flora of California
Flora of Oregon
Flora of Washington (state)
Flora of the Klamath Mountains
Natural history of the California Coast Ranges
Flora of the West Coast of the United States
Flora without expected TNC conservation status